was a town located in Kamiukena District, Ehime Prefecture, Japan.

As of 2003, the town had an estimated population of 3,555 and a density of 25.42 persons per km2. The total area was 139.84 km2.

On January 1, 2005, Oda, along with the town of Ikazaki (from Kita District), was merged into the expanded town of Uchiko and no longer exists as an independent municipality.

External links
Official website of Uchiko in Japanese

Dissolved municipalities of Ehime Prefecture
Uchiko, Ehime